The 61st Hong Kong–Macau Interport was a football match held in Hong Kong on 29 May 2005. Hong Kong won 8-1.

Squads

Hong Kong
 Directors: Lawrence Yu Kam-kee, Pui Kwan Kay
 Coaches: Lai Sun Cheung, Chu Kwok Kuen

Macau

Results

References

Hong Kong–Macau Interport
Macau
Hong